, also known as the , was the largest coal mine in Japan, located in the area of Ōmuta, Fukuoka and Arao, Kumamoto, Japan.

In 1960, it was the setting for the "Miike Struggle," which was the largest management-labor dispute in Japanese history.

History 
Mining began in the region during the Kyoho era, with the Miike mine under the control of the Tachibana clan.

The mine was nationalised in 1872 by the Meiji government.  The Mitsui zaibatsu took control in 1899.

The mine closed in 1997, with devastating effects on the local economy.

POW camp 
During World War II the mine was used as a prisoner of war camp, referred to as Fukuoka#17 - Omuta. Approximately 1,735 American and Allied prisoners were used as slave labor to mine coal and work in a Mitsui zinc foundry. It was the largest POW camp in the Empire. 138 prisoners died, of disease, accidents, and abuse.

Labor dispute 

In 1960, the mine became the center of a protracted labor dispute that evolved into the largest management-labor dispute in Japan's history.  When the Mitsui corporation attempted to lay off nearly 1,500 workers at the mine, the powerful miners union responded with massive protests and work stoppages that led to Mitsui locking out the miners for 312 days. The resultant clashes between miners, police, and right-wing gangsters escalated into violence. Ultimately, the protesting miners were defeated, and returned to work without achieving their demands, dealing a significant blow to the Japanese labor movement as a whole.

Incidents 
On November 9, 1963, 458 people were killed by an explosion and the resulting buildup of carbon monoxide. 438 of the deaths were due to carbon monoxide poisoning, and 839 others suffered from the effects of carbon monoxide poisoning, which can cause brain damage. In total, 1,197 of the 1,403 workers died or were injured as a result of the incident. Workers were told by the Mitsui Coal Mining company that a coal-dust explosion in the mine was impossible and were not educated on the potential for gas poisoning. The company had no provisions in place for isolating poisonous gas, in fact, at the time of the explosion, ventilation fans worked to actively spread the gas throughout the mine, leading to more deaths. Only around 200 of the workers knew of the explosion, mostly by hearing it firsthand. Despite making it to the lift, they were told by their officers not to leave and died due to carbon monoxide poisoning. The majority of the workers knew nothing of the explosion. Electricity and telephone communication were lost after the explosion, and initially, no attempts to rescue the workers were made by the company, which stated that it was too risky due to unclear conditions within the mine. As a result, workers remained trapped in the mine for three hours after the company was notified. The inexperienced, ill-advised rescue crews exacerbated the severity of the event by not following the protocols for rescuing victims of carbon monoxide poisoning. Over 200 of the workers who were already suffering from poisoning were sent back into the mines to attempt to rescue others. Of the 939 workers that survived, 839 suffered from serious carbon monoxide poisoning, which resulted in severe, permanent brain damage.

On January 18, 1984, an explosion at the mine claimed the lives of 83 workers.

Legacy 
The Miike mine was the subject of a Japanese documentary, Echoes from the Miike Mine (2006), directed by Hiroko Kumagai.

In 2015, the Miike Coal Mine, railway and port were designated as one of the UNESCO World Industrial Heritage sites of "Japan's Meiji Industrial Revolution: Iron and Steel, Shipbuilding and Coal Mining." The award was dependent upon Japan's promise to tell the "full history" of these sites that included a history of its forced labor for Koreans, Chinese, convicts, and POWs. On  July 22, 2021, UNESCO's World Heritage Committee found that Japan had not fulfilled its pledge and they were asked to come up with a new plan by December 2021.

See also
Miike Struggle

References

External links
 Former Miike Coal Mine Miyahara Pit, from Kyushu Tourism Information
 WWII Japanese POW Camp Fukuoka #17 - Omuta and Fukuoka POW Camp #17 - Omuta (Mansell) (access August 2, 2021)
 Japan's Meiji Industrial Revolution, official Japanese government site.
 Japan's World Heritage Miike Coal Mine - Where prisoners-of-war worked 'like slaves' http://apjjf.org/2021/13/Palmer.html, from Japan Focus, July 1, 2021

Coal mines in Japan
1997 disestablishments in Japan
Ōmuta, Fukuoka
Buildings and structures in Kumamoto Prefecture
Former mines in Japan
Buildings and structures in Fukuoka Prefecture
Former coal mines